Jeon Min-seo (born 20 May 2003) is a South Korean actress. She began her career as a child actress, notably in the television dramas Good Job, Good Job and Prime Minister & I.

Filmography

Television series

Film

Awards

References

External links
 
 
 

South Korean child actresses
South Korean film actresses
South Korean television actresses
2003 births
Living people
21st-century South Korean actresses
Place of birth missing (living people)